ADO Den Haag Vrouwen  is a Dutch football (soccer) club based in The Hague representing ADO Den Haag in the Vrouwen Eredivisie, the top women's football league in the Netherlands. Founded in 2007, the club is a founding member of the championship.

In 2012 the team won its first national championship. Later they achieved the double, when they also won the KNVB Women's Cup.

Honours
National
 Eredivisie
 Winners (1): 2011–12
 Dutch Cup
 Winners (3): 2012, 2013, 2016
 BeNe Super Cup
 Runner-up (1): 2012

Results

Eredivisie/BeNe League

European history

Current squad

Former players

Head coaches 
  Sjaak Polak (2019–Current)
  Arend Regeer (2016–2019)
  Marcel Valk (2014–2016)
  Sarina Wiegman (2007–2014)

Broadcasting
As of the 2020–21 season, league matches played on Sunday are broadcast on Fox Sports. Public service broadcaster NOS occasionally broadcasts some Sunday games live and provides game highlights during the Studio Sport programme.

Photo gallery

References

External links
Official site 

ADO Den Haag
Women's football clubs in the Netherlands
BeNe League teams
Eredivisie (women) teams
2007 establishments in the Netherlands
Association football clubs established in 2007
Football clubs in The Hague